The Rite of Spring is an album by flautist Hubert Laws released on the CTI label featuring jazz interpretations of classical music compositions.

Reception
The Allmusic review by Thom Jurek awarded the album 2½ stars stating "Long before Wynton decided he could play classical chops as well as the real long-haired interpreters, even though he was a jazz musician, Hubert Laws and his partners at CTI gave it a run with a jazz twist, and for the most part with a far more adventurous repertoire. Unfortunately, the results were just about as thrilling as Wynton's, with a few notable exceptions.

Track listing
 "Pavane" (Gabriel Fauré) - 7:43 
 "The Rite of Spring" (Igor Stravinsky) - 9:03 
 "Syrinx" (Claude Debussy) - 3:34 
 "Brandenburg Concerto #3 (First Movement)" (Johann Sebastian Bach) - 6:01 
 "Brandenburg Concerto #3 (Second Movement)" (Bach) - 4:27

Personnel
Hubert Laws - flute
Wally Kane, Jane Taylor - bassoon
Bob James - piano, electric piano, electric harpsichord
Gene Bertoncini, Stuart Scharf - guitar
Ron Carter - bass
Jack DeJohnette - drums 
Dave Friedman - vibraphone, percussion
Airto Moreira - percussion
Don Sebesky - arranger, conductor

References

 

1971 albums
CTI Records albums
Hubert Laws albums
Albums produced by Creed Taylor
Albums arranged by Don Sebesky
Albums conducted by Don Sebesky
Albums recorded at Van Gelder Studio